Donald Richie (17 April 1924 – 19 February 2013) was an American-born author who wrote about the Japanese people, the culture of Japan, and especially Japanese cinema. Although he considered himself primarily a film historian, Richie also directed a number of experimental films, the first when he was seventeen.

Biography
Richie was born in Lima, Ohio.  During World War II, he joined the United States Merchant Marine and served aboard Liberty ships as a purser and medical officer. By then he had already published his first work, "Tumblebugs" (1942), a short story.

In 1947, Richie first visited Japan with the American occupation force, a job he saw as an opportunity to escape from Lima, Ohio. He first worked as a typist, and then as a civilian staff writer for the Pacific Stars and Stripes. While in Tokyo, he became fascinated with Japanese culture, particularly Japanese cinema. He was soon writing movie reviews in the Stars and Stripes. In 1948 he met Kashiko Kawakita who introduced him to Yasujirō Ozu. During their long friendship, Richie and Kawakita collaborated closely in promoting Japanese film in the West. He began composing contemporary music and released a title for ballet at that time.

After returning to the United States, he  enrolled at Columbia University's School of General Studies in 1949 and received a B.S. degree in English in 1953. Richie then returned to Japan as film critic for The Japan Times and in 1959 published his first book, The Japanese Film: Art and Industry, coauthored with Joseph Anderson, which gave the first English language account of Japanese film. The greater tolerance in Japan for male homosexuality than in the United States was one reason he gave for returning to Japan, as he was openly bisexual. He spent much of the second half of the 20th century living and working alone in Tokyo, with the exception of a brief marriage to the American writer Mary Evans from 1961 to 1965. Richie served as Curator of Film at the New York Museum of Modern Art from 1969 to 1972. In 1988, he was invited to become the first guest director at the Telluride Film Festival.

Richie was a prolific author. Among his most noted works on Japan are The Inland Sea, a travel classic, and Public People, Private People, a look at some of Japan's most significant and most mundane people. He has compiled two collections of essays on Japan: A Lateral View and Partial Views. A collection of his writings has been published to commemorate fifty years of writing about Japan: The Donald Richie Reader. The Japan Journals: 1947–2004 consists of extended excerpts from his diaries.

In 1991, film makers Lucille Carra and Brian Cotnoir produced a film version of The Inland Sea, which Richie narrated. Produced by Travelfilm Company, the film won numerous awards, including Best Documentary at the Hawaii International Film Festival (1991) and the Earthwatch Film Award. It screened at the Sundance Film Festival in 1992.
 
Author Tom Wolfe described Richie as "the Lafcadio Hearn of our time, a subtle, stylish, and deceptively lucid medium between two cultures that confuse one another: the Japanese and the American."

Although Richie spoke Japanese fluently, he could neither read nor write it proficiently.

Richie died, aged 88, on February 19, 2013, in Tokyo.

Japanese cinema
Richie's most widely recognized accomplishments were his analyses of Japanese cinema.  With each subsequent book, he focused less on film theory and more on the conditions in which the films were made. There was an emphasis on the "presentational" nature of Japan's cinema, in contrast to the "representational" films of the West. In the foreword to Richie's book A Hundred Years Of Japanese Film, Paul Schrader writes, "Whatever we in the West know about Japanese film, and how we know it, we most likely owe to Donald Richie." Richie also penned analyses of two of Japan's best known filmmakers: Yasujirō Ozu and Akira Kurosawa. Because Richie was a friend of Fumio Hayasaka, who composed music for the cinema, he first met Kurosawa on the set of Drunken Angel, the director's initial collaboration with Toshiro Mifune.

Richie wrote the English subtitles for Akira Kurosawa's films Throne of Blood (1957), Red Beard (1965), Kagemusha (1980) and Dreams (1990).

In the 21st century, Richie provided audio commentaries for The Criterion Collection on DVDs of various classic Japanese films, notably those of Ozu (A Story of Floating Weeds and Early Summer), Mikio Naruse (When a Woman Ascends the Stairs), and Kurosawa (Drunken Angel, Rashomon, The Lower Depths, and The Bad Sleep Well), among others.

Books by Richie

The Honorable Visitors. Charles E Tuttle; 1949; 

With Watanabe Miyoko. Six Kabuki Plays (paperback). Hokuseido Press; 1953; 

Where Are the Victors? Tuttle Publishing. 1956. .
With Joseph L. Anderson. The Japanese Film: Art and Industry (paperback). Princeton University Press; 1959, revised 1983; 
Japanese Movies. Japan Travel Bureau, 1961
The Films of Akira Kurosawa. University of California Press, 1965. 3rd edition, expanded and updated, 1998. 
The Japanese Movie. An Illustrated History (hardcover). Kodansha Ltd; 1965; 

Erotic Gods Phallicism in Japan (slipcase). Shufushinsha; 1966; 
Companions of the Holiday (hardcover). Weatherhill; 1968; 
George Stevens: An American Romantic. New York, The Museum of Modern Art, 1970.

Zen Inklings: Some Stories, Fables, Parables, and Sermons (Buddhism & Eastern Philosophy) (Paperback) with prints by the author. Weatherhill, 1982. Without prints: 1982. 

Different People: Pictures of Some Japanese (hardcover). Kodansha Inc; 1987; Focus on Rashomon (hardcover). Rutgers University Press; 1987; Introducing Tokyo (hardcover). Kodansha Inc; 1987; Introducing Japan (hardcover). Kodansha International; 1987; Japanese Cinema: Film Style and National Character (paperback). Oxford University Press; 1990; Japanese Cinema: An Introduction (hardcover). Oxford University Press; 1990; The Inland Sea (paperback). Kodansha International; 1993;  The Temples of Kyoto (hardback). Tuttle Publishing; 1995; Partial Views: Essays on Contemporary Japan (paperback). Japan Times; 1995; Memoirs of the Warrior Kumagai: A Historical Novel (hardcover). Tuttle Publishing; 1999; Tokyo: A View of the City (paperback). Reaktion Books; 1999; 

 and Stone Bridge Press; 2010; 
 With Roy Garner. The Image Factory: Fads and Fashions in Japan (paperback). Reaktion Books; 2003; Japanese Literature Reviewed (hardcover). ICG Muse; 2003; A View from the Chuo Line and Other Stories (paperback), Printed Matter Press, 2004, SBN 4900178276
 With Hillary Raphael, Meital Hershkovitz. Outcast Samurai Dancer, Creation Books, 2004, 

 (paperback)Tokyo Nights (paperback). Printed Matter Press; 2005; Botandoro: Stories, Fables, Parables and Allegories: A Miscellany (paperback), Printed Matter Press; 2008; 

Films, books and papers on RichieSneaking In. Donald Richie's Life in Film. Directed by Brigitte Prinzgau-Podgorschek, Navigator Film Produktion/Peter Stockhaus Filmproduktion, GmbH, Vienna, 2002
 Silva, Arturo, ed. (2001). The Donald Richie Reader. Berkeley: Stone Bridge Press.  (cloth)
Klaus Volkmer and Olaf Möller.Ricercar fuer Donald Richie. Taschenbuch (1997)

Films by Richie
Richie was the author of about 30 experimental films, from five to 47 minutes long, six of which have been published on DVD as A Donald Richie Film Anthology (Japan, 2004). None were originally meant for public screening. The pieces on the DVD, all originally shot in 16 mm, are:
 Wargames (1962), 22 minutes
 Atami Blues (1962), 20 minutes, soundtrack by Tōru Takemitsu
 Boy With Cat (1967), 5 minutes
 Dead Youth (1967), 13 minutes
 Five Philosophical Fables (1967), 47 minutes
 Cybele (1968), 20 minutes

Among the short works not included in the collection are for example Small Town Sunday (1941, 8 mm), filmed when he was still resident in the United States, A Sentimental Education (1953), Aoyama Kaidan (1957), Shu-e (1958), and Life (1965).

Other films: 
 The Inland Sea (1992), Screenplay
 Akira Kurosawa (1975), 58 minutes, 35 mm in color and b/w. Produced by Atelier 41 for NTV, Tokyo
 A Doll (1968) 16 mm, 20 minutes, in color
 A Couple (1968), 35 mm, in b/w
 Nozoki Monogatari (1967), 16 mm, released by Brandon Films
  Khajuraho (1968), 16 mm, in color and b/w

Honors
 Kawakita Award first recipient in 1983
 Japan Foundation: Japan Foundation Award, 1995.
John D. Rockefeller 3rd Award (Asian Cultural Council) in 1993
National Society of Film Critics Awards, USA: Special Award (1971)

References

Further reading
 
 Silva, Arturo, ed. (2001). The Donald Richie Reader. Berkeley: Stone Bridge Press.  (cloth)

External links

 Conversation with Donald Richie, from Conversations with History: Institute of International Studies, UC Berkeley''

1924 births
2013 deaths
American expatriates in Japan
American Japanologists
American film critics
American film historians
American travel writers
American male non-fiction writers
Bisexual men
People associated with the Museum of Modern Art (New York City)
People from Lima, Ohio
United States Merchant Mariners
Writers from Ohio
Columbia University School of General Studies alumni
American subtitlers
American bisexual writers